Darren Law (born April 4, 1968) is a Canadian-born American racing driver.

At age 14 Law was the International Kart Federation national champion, and shortly thereafter began racing cars in various amateur classes on the west coast of the United States. In 1991 he was a factory driver for Elden Racing Cars' factory team in Formula Renault competition. In 1996 and 1997 he competed in the North American Touring Car Championship for the privateer Hartong Motorsports BMW outfit and finished 8th in points in the series' two years of operation. In 1999 he made a NASCAR Craftsman Truck Series start at Heartland Park Topeka, but crashed 34 laps in.

He joined the Grand American Road Racing Association's Rolex Sports Car Series in 2000 and finished 2nd in GTU class points. The following year he was the GT class champion. In 2002 he moved from production cars to prototypes and raced in the Rolex Series' SRPII class and was second in points. In 2003 he finished 4th in the new Daytona Prototype class, the series top category.

In 2004 he competed in both the Daytona Prototypes where he finished 14th and the American Le Mans Series GT2 class where he finished runner up in the GT2 class driver's championship. 2005 saw Law continue to split his time between DP, where he finished 12th for the Brumos Porsche team, and ALMS GT2 where he finished 13th in points for Flying Lizard Motorsports and Alex Job Racing. He continued with the same teams and series in 2006 and finished 14th in Grand Am DP and 10th in ALMS GT2. Driving for the same teams again in 2007, he improved to 6th in points in both series. In 2008, still with the same teams, he improved to 4th in the Daytona Prototype championship but dropped back to 7th in ALMS GT2.

Law was a part of the 2009 24 Hours of Daytona-winning crew driving a Brumos Racing-run Riley-Porsche, along with David Donohue, Antonio García and Buddy Rice.

He currently resides in Phoenix, Arizona.

Motorsports results

American Open-Wheel racing results

(key) (Races in bold indicate pole position, races in italics indicate fastest race lap)

USAC FF2000 Championship results

24 Hours of Le Mans results

WeatherTech SportsCar Championship results
(key)(Races in bold indicate pole position, Results are overall/class)

References

External links
Official website
grand-am.com bio
Interview with Darren Law on the Road Racers Podcast

1968 births
24 Hours of Daytona drivers
24 Hours of Le Mans drivers
American Le Mans Series drivers
American Speed Association drivers
Rolex Sports Car Series drivers
Living people
NASCAR drivers
Racing drivers from Phoenix, Arizona
Sportspeople from Toronto
WeatherTech SportsCar Championship drivers
U.S. F2000 National Championship drivers
Action Express Racing drivers
North American Touring Car Championship drivers